The Sunchaser (advertised simply as Sunchaser) is a 1996 crime drama film directed by Michael Cimino and starring Woody Harrelson, Jon Seda and Anne Bancroft.  It was director Cimino's last feature-length film.

Plot summary

During a medical visit, Blue, who is half Navajo,  discovers that he has only one or two months to live and decides to escape. He kidnaps Dr. Reynolds and forces him to drive to Arizona, to visit a mountain lake sacred to the Navajo people. The trip forces both to confront their sense of self and life choices.

Cast
 Woody Harrelson as Michael Reynolds
 Jon Seda as Brandon "Blue" Monroe
 Anne Bancroft as Renata Baumbauer
 Alexandra Tydings as Victoria Reynolds
 Matt Mulhern as Chip Byrnes
 Talisa Soto as Navajo Woman
 Richard Bauer as Dr. Bradford
 Victor Aaron as Webster Skyhorse
 Lawrence Pressman as FBI Agent-In-Charge Collier
 Michael O'Neill as FBI Agent Moreland
 Harry Carey Jr. as Cashier
 Carmen Dell'Orefice as Arabella
 Brooke Ashley as Calantha Reynolds
 Andrea Roth as Head Nurse
 Bob Minor as Deputy Lynch
 Brett Harrelson as Younger Highway Patrol Officer
 Andy Berman as Person In Oncology

Production
Mickey Rourke, a collaborator and friend of Cimino's, believes the director “snapped” sometime during the making of The Sunchaser. “Michael is the sort of person that if you take away his money he short-circuits,” Rourke says. “He is a man of honor.” Rourke did not say how or why Cimino “snapped.”

Joe D’Augustine, the film's editor, recalls his first meeting with Cimino: “It was kind of eerie, freaky. I was led into this dark editing room with black velvet curtains and there was this guy hunched over. They bring me into, like, his chamber, as if he was the Pope. Everyone was speaking in hushed tones. He had something covering his face, a handkerchief. He kept his face covered. And nobody was allowed to take his picture [...] Welcome to Ciminoville.”

According to Jon Seda, Cimino would frequently show up to set late and apparently under the influence of drugs. He described the production as troubled and the final product as mediocre. Nonetheless, he remains humbled by the chance to work with Cimino over thousands of others who auditioned for the role of Brandon "Blue" Monroe.

Release
A theatrical release was intended, but the film fared so poorly with test audiences that it went straight to video in the United States. The film was entered into competition at the 1996 Cannes Film Festival where it was nominated for the Palme D'Or.

Critical reception
The film received largely negative reviews. Todd McCarthy of Variety wrote, "Michael Cimino's return to filmmaking after a six-year layoff is a conceptually bold tale marked, in its execution, both by visceral intensity and dramatic sloppiness." Jo-Ann Pittman wrote in Film Directors that The Sunchaser had "a predictable and often laughable script. Not good considering it is a drama. The characters are stereotypical and the story again lacks direction. It attempts to handle too many stories at one time. The New Age mystical healing waters are cliche as is the kidnapper/victim story." Leonard Maltin gave the film one and a half stars: "Misbegotten mess tries to touch all trendy bases, scrambling American Indian mysticism, 'New Age' theories and buddy-movie clichés into the format of a road movie."

Kevin Thomas of Los Angeles Times gave The Sunchaser one of its few positive notices. While noting the predictability of the script, Thomas added, "Yet all that's so familiar in Charles 
Leavitt's script has been given a fresh, brisk spin by the sheer audacity and force of Cimino's style and by an incisive, wide-ranging performance by Harrelson..."

On review aggregation website Rotten Tomatoes, The Sunchaser has a "rotten" approval rating of 17% based on 6 reviews, with an average rating of 4.8/10.

Footnotes

References

Further reading
 Camy, Gerard. "Sunchaser." Jeune cinéma n238 Summer (1996)
 Troubiana, Serge. "Loin d'Hollywood." Cahiers du cinéma n503 Jun (1996) [on The Sunchaser]
 Saada, Nicolas and Serge Troubiana. "Entretien avec Michael Cimino." Cahiers du cinéma n503 Jun (1996) 
 Cieutat, Michel. "Sunchaser." Positif n425/426 Jul/Aug (1996)
 Ciment, Michel and Laurent Vachaud. "Un film optimiste et plein d'espoir." Positif n425/426 Jul/Aug (1996) [on The Sunchaser]
 Feeney, F.X. "Between Heaven and Hell." People 46.20 (1996) [Interview]
 Kemp, Philip. "The Sunchaser." Sight & Sound 7 Jan (1997)

External links

The Sunchaser at Unofficial French website

See also
Monument Valley

1996 crime drama films
1996 films
American crime drama films
American road movies
Films about Native Americans
Films directed by Michael Cimino
Films scored by Maurice Jarre
Regency Enterprises films
Films produced by Arnon Milchan
1990s English-language films
1990s American films